Rinaldo Ruatti (19 January 1930 – 30 September 2020) was an Italian bobsledder who competed in the early 1960s. He won two medals in the two-man event at the FIBT World Championships with a gold in 1962 and a silver in 1965. He also competed at the 1968 Winter Olympics.

References

External links
Bobsleigh two-man world championship medalists since 1931

1930 births
2020 deaths
Italian male bobsledders
Olympic bobsledders of Italy
Bobsledders at the 1968 Winter Olympics